Matthew Millar is an Australian professional footballer who plays as a right back for A-League Men club Macarthur FC.

Millar is from a family of ten children, eight of them male and two female. He played junior football at Langwarrin.

Club career

Melbourne City
On 21 October 2015 he made his senior professional debut for Melbourne City in a 2015 FFA Cup match against Perth Glory. He made his A-league debut against Newcastle Jets off the bench.

South Melbourne
In February 2016, Millar left Melbourne City to return to the National Premier Leagues Victoria, signing for reigning premiers South Melbourne. On 19 May 2016, after 7 goals in 14 appearances, Millar extended his contract with South Melbourne until the end of the 2017 NPL Victoria season.

Central Coast Mariners
In July 2018, Millar returned to the A-League, signing a one-year contract with Central Coast Mariners. When Millar signed with rivals the Jets he was famously told to go home upon announcing his move at training.

Newcastle Jets
On 1 February 2019 it was announced Millar had signed for the Newcastle Jets for the 19-20 A-League season.

For his first season at Newcastle he started every game for the club, except the last 2 due to an injury. He played predominantly as a very attacking wing back and was their equal 2nd top goalscorer with 4 goals as well as 3 assists.

During the same season he received a NAB Young Player of the Year nomination in March. Riley McGree was the winner of the award for the season.

Shrewsbury Town (loan)
On 5 October 2020, Millar joined League One side Shrewsbury Town on a short-term loan deal until January 2021 with an option to buy. He scored his first goal for Shrewsbury on 10 November 2020 in an EFL Trophy group game against Crewe Alexandra. After the club were unable to agree a deal for a permanent transfer, Millar returned to Australia on 19 January 2021.

St Mirren 
On 7 September 2021, Millar moved to Scotland to sign a 1-year contract for St Mirren in the Scottish Premiership.

Macarthur FC 
After not being able to solidify a place in St Mirren’s starting 11, Millar returned to the A-League Men signing for Macarthur FC on a one-year deal.

Career statistics

Honours
Macarthur
Australia Cup: 2022

References

External links
 

1996 births
Living people
Association football defenders
Australian soccer players
Melbourne City FC players
South Melbourne FC players
Central Coast Mariners FC players
Newcastle Jets FC players
Shrewsbury Town F.C. players
St Mirren F.C. players
Macarthur FC players
A-League Men players
National Premier Leagues players

Expatriate footballers in Scotland
Scottish Professional Football League players
Expatriate footballers in England
Australian expatriate soccer players
Australian expatriate sportspeople in England
Australian expatriate sportspeople in Scotland
Soccer players from Melbourne
Australian people of Scottish descent